Tamburi is an Italian surname. Notable people with the surname include:

 Luciana Tamburi (1952–2006),  Italian actress and television hostess
 Orfeo Tamburi (1910–1994), Italian painter and scenic designer

See also 
 Tamburo

Italian-language surnames